For the World Games, there have been two venues that have been or be used to host muaythai.

Notes

References

 
Muaythai
Venues